A boson is a particle that has integer spin. 

Boson may also refer to:

 John Boson, woodworker
 John Boson (writer) (1655–1730), writer in the Cornish language
 Nicholas Boson (1624–1708), writer in Cornish
 Nicholas Bozon (fl. c. 1320), Anglo-Norman writer
 Thomas Boson (1635–1719), writer in Cornish
 Boso of Provence (Boson, c. 841–887)

See also

 Boatswain, bo's'n, bos'n, or bosun
 The Bosonid dynasty, a dynasty of Franks
 Bosön
 Barbara Bosson (1939–2023), American actress
 Bosson (born 1969), Swedish singer-songwriter

Cornish-language surnames